Dalem may refer to:

 Dalem, Netherlands, a village in the municipality of Gorinchem
 Dalem, Moselle, a commune of the Moselle department in France
 Dalem (Raja), a royal title on Bali

See also
 Dahlem (disambiguation)
 Dalum (disambiguation)